The term stiff voice describes the pronunciation of consonants or vowels with a glottal opening narrower, and the vocal folds stiffer, than occurs in modal voice. Although there is no specific IPA diacritic for stiff voice, the voicing diacritic (a subscript wedge) may be used in conjunction with the symbol for a voiced consonant. In Bru, for example, stiff-voiced vowels have tenseness in the glottis and pharynx without going so far as to be creaky voiced, whereas slack-voiced vowels are lax in the glottis without going so far as to be breathy voice.

One language with stiff voice is Thai:

Javanese contrasts stiff and slack voiced bilabial, dental, retroflex, and velar stops:

Mpi (Loloish) contrasts modals and stiff voice in its vowels. This is not register: for each of the six Mpi tones, a word may have either a modal or stiff-voiced vowel. For example, low tone contrasts  'blood' and  'seven'.

References

Phonation